The term, non-Jewish African refugees, primarily refers to the Sudanese and Eritrean refugee population migrating to Israel through the Sinai Desert. Israeli policy concerning these refugees has evolved from a policy of neutrality to a policy of deterrence. These refugees began arriving in Israel in the 21st century, led by Bedouin smugglers. The current non-Jewish African refugee population in Israel is approximately 36,000.

Most non-Jewish African refugees have been granted "conditional release" visas, which are not valid work permits in Israel. Lack of a valid work permit severely limits their economic opportunities. There was a case of a riot targeting African refugees in Tel Aviv, although the Israeli government has arrested and subsequently punished the perpetrators.

Israeli citizens living in neighborhoods with large refugee populations have mixed attitudes towards them. Some have claimed refugees are "rapists" and "criminals", while others living in the same neighborhood described them as "peaceful" and "kind." With tensions rising and shifting Israeli policy, both deterrence and support for the refugees has increased. Israeli policy toward African refugees have been heavily influenced by the advocacy and legal work of several nonprofits, including the Hotline for Refugees and Migrants, Kav LaOved, Association for Civil Rights in Israel, and others.

2000–2006 
Prior to 2000, the Israeli government had not created any specific policies for handling incoming refugees. The determination of refugee status was outsourced to the United Nations High Commissioner for Refugees (UNHCR). Until 2006, there were no challenges to this system due to the low number of refugees. Later, a new law was established in which the UNHCR would process asylum applications and send a recommendation to the Israeli National Status Granting Body, which was tasked with deciding refugee status. 

Approved refugees received temporary residency and temporary work permits in Israel. However, the Israeli government granted only 170 permits of this kind between 2002-2005. Moreover, individuals identified as "citizens of enemy states" were not allowed to seek asylum. This was the status of all Sudanese refugees in Israel since both countries have no diplomatic relations.

The rapid increase in the number of Eritrean and Sudanese immigrants beginning in 2006 changed the Israeli policy towards refugees from these two countries. From then on, the Israeli government began to work towards creating an environment that would be undesirable to refugees. However, in 2007, the Israeli government was still issuing three-month renewable "conditional release" visas, which allowed Eritrean and Sudanese refugees to work. Beginning 2010, all visas upon renewal were issued with a stamp indicating that "this visa is not a working permit." 

This policy ensured that refugees were protected from deportation to their countries of origin, but they could not legally work in Israel. Due to the precarious legal work status of refugees, they are often discriminated against for job opportunities and have to rely on infrequent jobs to make ends meet.

2006–2008 
Prior to 2006 and throughout 2007, Israeli policy was to detain all refugees from "enemy states" for months at a time. This policy was later discontinued. In addition, there existed a policy to return refugees to the Sinai desert if they had crossed the border into Israel, but this policy was also ended later by the decision of the Israeli Supreme Court.

2009–2014 
In 2009, the Israeli government formed a Refugee Status Determination (RSD) Unit that works closely with the United Nations. The Israeli Immigration and Border Authority processes all asylum requests and authorizes temporary group protection. Most of the Sudanese and Eritrean refugees fell into the latter category, a categorization that significantly delays registration as refugees.

In 2012, Israel built a fence along their border with Egypt to deter the illegal migration of African refugees. The fence has significantly decreased the influx of Sudanese and Eritrean refugees into Israel. Later that same year, an emergency plan was set in motion to deport refugees to their home countries. Voluntary deportees would be given an opportunity for self-removal and receive 1,000 Euro to assist in repatriation to their homelands.

2015–2018 
By 2015, the Israeli government began giving Sudanese and Eritrean refugees a choice to either return to their home countries, move to another state, or be imprisoned. Many migrants lived in facilities such as Saharonim Prison and similar ones, where they are free to leave during the day, but must return at night or face imprisonment.

During the spring of 2018, Prime Minister Benjamin Netanyahu reached a deal with the United Nations High Commissioner for Refugees (UNHCR) to relocate many refugees into western nations over a period of five years. Israel agreed to grant temporary residency to those who remained. The deal soon fell apart due to pressure from within Netanyahu's own government.

References

Eritrean refugees
Refugees in Israel
Sudanese refugees